Charaxes harmodius is a butterfly in the family Nymphalidae. It was described by Cajetan Felder and Rudolf Felder in 1867. It is found in the Indomalayan realm.

Charaxes harmodius is a large coppery butterfly with concave forewings with a  brown apex and border and hindwings with a very small tail decorated with a submarginal line of dark brown dots with white pupils,  the first a patch including two pupils of white. The reverse is coppery brown suffused with purple.

Subspecies
Charaxes harmodius harmodius (Java)
Charaxes harmodius martinus Rothschild, 1900 (Sumatra, Peninsular Malaysia)
Charaxes harmodius infernus Rothschild, 1903 (Borneo)
Charaxes harmodius harpagon Staudinger, 1889 (Palawan)
Charaxes harmodius maruyamai Hanafusa, 1987 (Peninsular Malaysia)
Charaxes harmodius shiloi Hanafusa, 1994 (Laos)

References

External links
Charaxes Ochsenheimer, 1816 at Markku Savela's Lepidoptera and Some Other Life Forms

harmodius
Butterflies described in 1867
Butterflies of Asia
Taxa named by Baron Cajetan von Felder
Taxa named by Rudolf Felder